The 2009 Autosport 1000 km of Silverstone was the fifth and final race of the 2009 Le Mans Series season. It took place at the Silverstone Circuit, England, on 13 September 2009. The race was won from pole position by Olivier Panis and Nicolas Lapierre for Team Oreca, while the third-place finishing Aston Martin of Jan Charouz, Tomáš Enge and Stefan Mücke won the LMP1 championship. Speedy Racing Team Sebah won their first race in the LMP2 category while the ASM Team failed to finish but were able to win their championship. First-time LMS entrant Gigawave Motorsport led the GT1 category while JMW Motorsport won in GT2. Team Felbermayr-Proton secured the GT2 class championship by finishing in seventh in their class.

Report

Qualifying

Qualifying result
Pole position winners in each class are marked in bold.

Race

Race result
Class winners in bold.  Cars failing to complete 70% of winner's distance marked as Not Classified (NC).

References

External links
 Le Mans Series - Autosport 1000 km of Silverstone

Silverstone
6 Hours of Silverstone
Silverstone